Markus Brier (born 5 July 1968) is one of relatively few Austrian touring professional golfers, and as of 2008 was his country's second highest ranked player, behind Bernd Wiesberger.

Brier won the Swiss and German Amateur Opens in the mid-1990s, and turned professional in 1995 at a relatively late age. Nine top ten finishes, including five top threes, on the 1999 Challenge Tour earned him third place on the season ending money list and playing privileges on the European Tour for 2000. He retained his tour card through his final position on the order of merit every year, except for 2002 and 2010 when he regained it through final qualifying school.

Since joining the European Tour, Brier has continued to play in his home event, the Austrian Open, winning it on two occasions during a period when it was a Challenge Tour event. In 2006 the tournament was promoted back onto the main European Tour schedule, now under the sponsored title BA-CA Golf Open. In its first year back, Brier once again took the title, in the process becoming the first Austrian golfer to win a European Tour event. This win helped him to his then best year-end finish on the Order of Merit of 49th.

Brier's second European Tour win came in 2007 at the Volvo China Open and he improved his position on the year end Order of Merit to 32nd. He has also featured in the top 100 of the Official World Golf Rankings.

In 2012, Brier failed to regain his card at qualifying school. He failed to do so again in 2016 at age 48. He was the oldest competitor during 2016 Q School. Had he placed high enough, he would have been the oldest player to graduate to the European Tour via Q School.

Amateur wins
 1994 Swiss Amateur Open Championship
 1995 German Amateur Open Championship

Professional wins (9)

European Tour wins (2)

1Co-sanctioned by the Asian Tour

European Tour playoff record (0–1)

Challenge Tour wins (2)

Challenge Tour playoff record (0–1)

Alps Tour wins (3)

*Note: The 2005 MAN NÖ Open was shortened to 54 holes due to weather.

Other wins (1)
 2013 Zurich Open

European Senior Tour wins (1)

European Senior Tour playoff record (0–1)

Results in major championships

CUT = missed the half-way cut
"T" = tied
Note: Brier never played in the Masters Tournament or the U.S. Open.

Results in senior major championships

"T" indicates a tie for a place
CUT = missed the halfway cut
NT = No tournament due to COVID-19 pandemic

Team appearances
Amateur
 European Boys' Team Championship (representing Austria): 1985
 European Amateur Team Championship (representing Austria): 1991, 1993
Eisenhower Trophy (representing Austria): 1988, 1990, 1992, 1994

Professional
 World Cup (representing Austria): 2004, 2007
 Seve Trophy (representing Continental Europe): 2007

See also
 2010 European Tour Qualifying School graduates

References

External links

  
 
 

Austrian male golfers
European Tour golfers
Sportspeople from Vienna
1968 births
Living people